Hogglestock may refer to:

 A fictional town in Barsetshire, in the works of Anthony Trollope, especially The Last Chronicle of Barset
 A fictional hedgehog in Prince Caspian by C. S. Lewis